Perikleia (before 1925: Μπερίσλαφ - Berislaf) is a village in Pella regional unit, Macedonia, Greece.

Perikleia had 373 inhabitants in 1981. In fieldwork done by Riki Van Boeschoten in late 1993, Perikleia was populated by Aromanians. The Aromanian language was used by people of all ages, both in public and private settings, and as the main language for interpersonal relationships. Some elderly villagers had little knowledge of Greek.

References

Populated places in Pella (regional unit)
Aromanian settlements in Greece